Yalım is a former village, and current neighborhood of Mardin in the Artuklu District of Mardin Province in Turkey. It is populated by Kurds of the Daşî and Meşkinan tribes and had a population of 21,715 in 2021.

Administrative history 
Yalım was a village until 1995 when it became a municipality (belde). It maintained the belde status until  2012 when it became attached to the city of Mardin as a neighborhood.

Population

References 

Villages in Artuklu District
Kurdish settlements in Mardin Province